DeBusk is an unincorporated community in central Greene County, Tennessee.

Education
South Greene Middle School

References

Unincorporated communities in Tennessee
Unincorporated communities in Greene County, Tennessee